The New Zealand cricket team toured the United Arab Emirates between October and December 2018 to play three Tests, three One Day Internationals (ODIs) and three Twenty20 International (T20Is) matches against Pakistan. Originally, the tour was scheduled to have three Tests, five ODIs and one T20I match.

In February 2018, the Pakistan Cricket Board (PCB) looked at the possibility of hosting this series and Australia's tour to the UAE in Malaysia instead of the UAE, due to domestic Twenty20 fixture congestion in Sharjah. In May 2018, the PCB invited New Zealand to play the fixtures in Pakistan. In June 2018, the PCB and the Emirates Cricket Board (ECB) agreed to play Pakistan's future matches in the UAE. In July 2018, New Zealand Cricket (NZC) confirmed that they had declined the PCB's offer to play the T20I fixtures in Pakistan because of security concerns. Therefore, all the matches on the tour took place in the UAE as scheduled.

Pakistan won the T20I series 3–0, setting a new record for the most consecutive series wins in T20Is, with eleven. The ODI series was drawn 1–1, after the third match finished as a no result due to rain.

During the third Test, Pakistan's Mohammad Hafeez announced that he would retire from Test cricket following the conclusion of the match, to focus on limited-overs cricket. Hafeez said that the time was right to retire from Test cricket and that he was honoured to represent Pakistan in 55 Test matches, including captaining the side. In the same match, Pakistan's Yasir Shah set a new record for the fastest bowler to take 200 wickets in Tests. He achieved it in his 33rd Test, breaking an 82-year old record that was set by Clarrie Grimmett of Australia, who took his 200th wicket in his 36th match. New Zealand went on to win the Test series 2–1. It was New Zealand's first away Test series win against Pakistan since 1969.

Squads

Ahead of the tour, Martin Guptill was ruled out of New Zealand's ODI and T20I squads with a calf injury. Corey Anderson, Glenn Phillips and Ajaz Patel were added to New Zealand's T20I squad before the start of the tour. Ahead of the ODI series, Lockie Ferguson, Ajaz Patel and George Worker were added to New Zealand's ODI squad. Todd Astle was ruled out of both the ODI and Test series with a knee injury with William Somerville replacing him in New Zealand's Test squad.

T20I series

1st T20I

2nd T20I

3rd T20I

ODI series

1st ODI

2nd ODI

3rd ODI

Test series

1st Test

2nd Test

3rd Test

Notes

References

External links
 Series home at ESPN Cricinfo

2018 in New Zealand cricket
2018 in Pakistani cricket
International cricket competitions in 2018–19
New Zealand cricket tours of Pakistan
International cricket tours of the United Arab Emirates